AvaGlide is avatar-based title, developed by British indie studio Haiku Interactive and published on the Xbox Live Indie Games channel. It was released in 2010, and praised for its visuals and gameplay.

Gameplay
AvaGlide uses a player's Xbox avatar in a series of hang-gliding minigames. Three minigames include navigating the glider through rings to collect points and time bonuses, hitting targets with crates dropped while gliding, and a course to collect as many points as possible. Multiplayer functionality is enabled.

Development
AvaGlide uses the SunBurn XNA Game Engine from Synapse Gaming and a physics library.

References

External links
 AvaGlide webpage
 AvaGlide's developer, Haiku Interactive

2010 video games
Xbox 360 games
Indie video games
Xbox 360 Live Indie games
Xbox 360-only games
North America-exclusive video games
Multiplayer and single-player video games
Video games developed in the United Kingdom